is a train station in the town of Mihama, Chita District, Aichi Prefecture, Japan, operated by Meitetsu.

Lines

Station layout
The station has a single side platform for bi-directional traffic, with a small one-story station building located alongside. The platform is short, and can service trains of only six carriages or less. . The station has automated ticket machines, Manaca automated turnstiles and is unattended..

Adjacent stations

Station history
Mihama-ryokuen Station was opened on April 24, 1987. In 2007, the Tranpass system of magnetic fare cards with automatic turnstiles was implemented.

Passenger statistics
In fiscal 2018, the station was used by an average of 223 passengers daily.

Surrounding area
Sugimoto Art Museum

See also
 List of Railway Stations in Japan

References

External links

 Official web page 

Railway stations in Japan opened in 1987
Railway stations in Aichi Prefecture
Stations of Nagoya Railroad
Mihama, Aichi